The Hoher Weißzint is a mountain in the Zillertal Alps on the border between Tyrol, Austria, and South Tyrol, Italy.

References 
 Heinrich Klier und Walter Klier: Alpenvereinsführer Zillertaler Alpen, München 1996, 
 Eduard Richter (Redaktion): Die Erschliessung der Ostalpen, Band III, Verlag des Deutschen und Oesterreichischen Alpenvereins, Berlin 1894, Seite 635
 Alpenvereinskarte 1:25.000, Blatt 35/1, Zillertaler Alpen West (Die Edelrauthütte/Eisbruggjochhütte ist auf dieser Karte nicht verzeichnet, da sie außerhalb des Ausschnitts liegt)
 Tabacco-Verlag, Udine: Carta Topografica 1:25.000, Blatt 037, Hochfeiler, Pfunderer Berge

External links 

Mountains of the Alps
Mountains of Tyrol (state)
Mountains of South Tyrol
Alpine three-thousanders
Zillertal Alps
Austria–Italy border
International mountains of Europe